Major-General Ahmed Bousteila was the former commander of the National Gendarmerie of Algeria. from the 5 July 2000 until the 10 of September 2015.

Early life and career

Bousteila Bousteila was born in Aïn M'lilain Oum el-Bouaghi on 8 April 1944, and it is suggested that he may take the helm at the ministry of defence. He joined the FLN Army as a Conscript in 1962 during the final stages of the War of Independence, and after Independence moved up the ranks to secure a commission from the Military Academy. Bousteila Bousteila was commissioned into the Army Signal Corps in 1965 and transferred to the Gendarmerie in 1969. He was trained in Intelligence work in the Soviet Union. In 1991, Bousteila Bousteila was promoted to Brigadier General and Commander of the 12th Gendarmerie Brigade. In 1996, he was promoted to Major General and Commander of the 2nd Security Division i.e. covering all Gendarmerie Divisions in North-Western Algeria.
Bousteila Bousteila was promoted to Lieutenant general rank on 5 July 2014.
He was involved in the Algerian government's rollout of biometric passports and also ordered increased security measures on roads.

References

2018 deaths
People from Oum El Bouaghi Province
1944 births
Algerian generals
21st-century Algerian people